Andrés Urrea (born 31 August 1994) is a Mexican-born Colombian tennis player.

Urrea has a career high ATP singles ranking of 1081 achieved on 23 September 2019. He also has a career high doubles ranking of 815 achieved on 27 June 2022.

Urrea has won 1 ATP Challenger doubles title at the 2022 Open Bogotá with Nicolás Mejía.

Tour titles

Doubles

References

External links
 
 

1994 births
Living people
Colombian male tennis players
Sportspeople from Mexico City
21st-century Colombian people